The Vespa GTS range is a scooter currently manufactured by Piaggio under the Vespa brand.

GTS stands for Granturismo Sport, while the 250ie is the displacement and electronic fuel injection.

History

The GTS 250ie is a development of the design direction, and restyled, from the Vespa GT200. Along with the engine changes are digital gauges, a tachometer, chrome fender-crest, chrome horn grill, restyled rear fairings/taillight, chrome foldable rack, redesigned centerstand, non-painted front suspension cover, and a restyled seat.

Where the GT200 used the Piaggio 'Leader' engine, the GTS models use variations of the new architecture of the 'Quasar' engine.

The engine has a displacement of 244 cc. Along with electronic fuel injection, the water-cooled motor also has four valves and a single overhead camshaft.

In 2008, Piaggio released a 278 cc special edition of the GTS, named the Vespa GTS300ie Super.

Comparison of the specifications and performance, on paper, between the GTS250ie and the GTS300ie Super does not show significant differences in either power or top speed. The GTS300ie does have an advantage with acceleration and with torque, which peaks lower down the rev range.

The GTS300ie Super was restyled over the original GT and GTS models to give a mildly more sporty look, and was originally available only in either black or white.

The restyling of the GTS300ie saw the replacement of the GTS250's fold down tail rack, with a simple grab-handle / loop. However, the fold down tail rack is still available as an optional extra, to allow the fitment of the tail-mounted storage box. 

Additional changes included:
The small front running light was deleted, with cosmetic detail changes to the 'horn' panel.
The headlight had a black detailing.
The instrumentation on the dash returned to analogue dials (as opposed to the part-digital display with the GTS250).
The front (suspension) spring is coloured red.
The right-hand body panel features (cosmetic) vents, to reflect earlier (air-cooled) Vespa designs.

It is considered to have been designed in reply to the Honda SH300i, which was designed and built by Honda as an upmarket, high-powered scooter aimed at outselling the original Vespa GTS in Europe.

In 2019, Vespa released an updated version of the GTS, the Vespa 300i GTS HPE. The main change for this update was a new High Performance Engine (HPE) with 24 HP (17.5kW) at 8,250 rpm and 26 Nm of torque at 5,250 rpm. Engine displacement remained the same at 278 cc. The new engine can be recognized by the smooth cover on the left and the oil dipstick on the right. Gearbox oil dipstick remains on the left rear. In terms of styling, the front of the scooter has significantly changed. The bodywork has a more noticeable line below the daylight running lights. Also the 'tie' has now been extended to the full length of the front. Rear styling remains the same. The scooter now has full LED lights, daytime running lights and indicators in the front, and a revised rear light.

External links
 Vespa GTS - Vespa.com
 Vespa GTS300ie specifications
 Vespa USA site

Piaggio Vespa